Calcium bisulfite (calcium bisulphite) is an inorganic compound which is the salt of a calcium cation and a bisulfite anion. It may be prepared by treating lime with an excess of sulfur dioxide and water. As a food additive it is used as a preservative under the E number E227.  Calcium bisulfite is an acid salt and behaves like an acid in aqueous solution.  It is used in the sulfite process for producing paper from wood chips.

See also
 Pulp (paper)
 Potassium bisulfite
 Sodium bisulfite

References

Food additives
Calcium compounds
Bisulfites
E-number additives